Beyond, in comics, may refer to:

 Beyond!, a 2006 limited series from Marvel Comics
 Beyond (Virgin Comics), a 2008 series from Virgin Comics
 Beyond the Beyond (manga), a manga series

See also
 Beyond (disambiguation)
 Beyonder, a Marvel Comics character
 Beyonders, a Marvel Comics species
 Beyond Corporation©, a fictional organisation in Marvel Comics
 From Beyond the Unknown, a DC Comics series